Plamen Krumov (born 4 November 1985) is a Bulgarian professional footballer who plays for Vitosha Bistritsa. In the early years of his career, he usually played as a winger, but has later been converted to right-back.

Career
Krumov began his career at Lokomotiv Sofia where he made 17 A PFG appearances in four seasons. Whilst at Lokomotiv Stadium he spent time out on loan at Zagorets, Rilski Sportist and Armenian club Banants Yerevan before joining Minyor Pernik on a permanent basis in the early of 2009. He signed for Minyor on a one-and-a-half-year deal.

When his contract expired, Krumov joined Chernomorets Burgas on a free transfer. He played regularly for Chernomorets during the 2010–11 season and the first half of 2011–12 season.

On 8 February 2013, Krumov signed for Beroe Stara Zagora on a one-and-a-half-year deal. He made his league debut against Botev Vratsa on 2 March, playing the full 90 minutes.

On 3 February 2014, Krumov joined Levski Sofia for an undisclosed fee. He signed a one-and-a-half-year contract. Krumov received number 71 shirt. On 22 February, he made his official debut, scoring a goal against Slavia Sofia from a free kick to help his team secure a 2:2 draw.

Career statistics

Honours

Club
Beroe
Bulgarian Cup (1): 2012–13
Bulgarian Supercup (1): 2013

References

External links
 
 Profile at LevskiSofia.info

1985 births
Living people
Bulgarian footballers
Association football midfielders
First Professional Football League (Bulgaria) players
Armenian Premier League players
Liga I players
FC Lokomotiv 1929 Sofia players
PFC Rilski Sportist Samokov players
FC Urartu players
PFC Minyor Pernik players
PFC Chernomorets Burgas players
CS Concordia Chiajna players
FC Universitatea Cluj players
PFC Beroe Stara Zagora players
PFC Levski Sofia players
PFC Slavia Sofia players
PFC Lokomotiv Plovdiv players
FC Arda Kardzhali players
FC Tsarsko Selo Sofia players
Expatriate footballers in Armenia
Expatriate footballers in Romania
Bulgarian expatriate footballers
Bulgarian expatriate sportspeople in Armenia